The Military ranks of São Tomé and Príncipe are the military insignia used by the Armed Forces of São Tomé and Príncipe.

Commissioned officer ranks
The rank insignia of commissioned officers.

Other ranks
The rank insignia of non-commissioned officers and enlisted personnel.

References

São Tomé and Príncipe
Military of São Tomé and Príncipe